John Thomas Nicholas (26 November 1910 – 14 February 1977) was an English professional footballer who played as a wing half.

Career
Born in Derby, Nicholas spent his entire professional career with Derby County, making 347 appearances for them in the Football League between 1928 and 1947. He captained them in the 1946 FA Cup Final.

Nicholas also spent time as Caretaker Manager and Chief Scout at Derby.

References

1910 births
1977 deaths
English footballers
English football managers
Derby County F.C. players
English Football League players
Derby County F.C. managers
Association football midfielders
Footballers from Derby
FA Cup Final players